William Albert Shear (born 1942) is Trinkle Professor Emeritus at Hampden-Sydney College, Virginia. He is a spider and myriapod expert who has published more than 200 scientific articles primarily on harvestman and millipede taxonomy.

He was born in Coudersport, Pennsylvania, completed his undergraduate work at College of Wooster, masters at the University of New Mexico, and PhD at the Museum of Comparative Zoology at Harvard University under the supervision of Herbert Walter Levi.

While at Harvard, Shear completed a revision of the millipede family Cleidogonidae and reclassification of the order Chordeumatida. He is an expert in Paleozoic arthropods, and has published several papers on fossil millipedes, centipedes, and spiders. A number of species are named after him, including Hypochilus sheari Platnick, 1987 and Brachoria sheari Marek, 2010.

Shear is a lifetime appointee as Senior Scientific Associate at the Virginia Museum of Natural History and is a research associate at the American Museum of Natural History and Museum of Comparative Zoology.

He lives in Farmville, Virginia, and is an avid iris gardener and Godan (fifth degree black belt) in Shōrin-ryū Shōrinkan traditional Okinawan karate.

References

External links 
 http://www.hsc.edu/Academics/Academic-Majors/Biology/Professors/William-Shear.html
 http://www.bbc.com/earth/story/20150623-millipedes-use-chemical-weapons

Hampden–Sydney College faculty
People from Potter County, Pennsylvania
College of Wooster alumni
University of New Mexico alumni
Harvard University alumni
1942 births
Living people
Arachnologists
Myriapodologists
American arachnologists
Shōrin-ryū practitioners